Haplogroup H (Y-DNA), also known as H-L901/M2939 is a Y-chromosome haplogroup.

The primary branch H1 (H-M69) and its subclades is one of the most predominant haplogroups amongst populations in South Asia, particularly its descendant H1a1 (M52). A primary branch of H-M52, H1a1a (H-M82), is found commonly among the Romani people, who originated in South Asia and migrated into the Middle East and Europe, around the beginning of the 2nd millennium CE and the Khmer people who got under influence from Indian populations. The much rarer primary branch H3 (Z5857) is also concentrated in South Asia.

However, the primary branch H2 (P96) seems to have been found in sparse levels primarily in Europe and West Asia since prehistory. Pre-Pottery Neolithic B (PPNB) is part of the Pre-Pottery Neolithic, a Neolithic culture centered in upper Mesopotamia and the Levant, dating to  years ago has been found in remains also the later Linear Pottery culture and Neolithic Iberia. H2 likely entered Europe during the Neolithic with the spread of agriculture. Its present distribution is made up of various individual cases spread out throughout Europe and West Asia today.

Structure 
H-L901/M2939 is a direct descendant of Haplogroup GHIJK. There are, in turn, three direct descendants of H-L901/M2939 – their defining SNPs are as follows:
 H1 (L902/M3061) 
 H1a previously haplogroup H1 (M69/Page45, M370)
 H1b   B108, Z34961, Z34962, Z34963, Z34964
 H2 previously haplogroup F3, (P96, L279, L281, L284, L285, L286, M282) 
 H2a FGC29299/Z19067
 H2b Z41290
 H2c Y21618, Z19080
 H3 (Z5857)
 H3a  (Z5866)
H3b (Z13871)

Ancient distribution 
H-L901/M2939 is believed to have split from HIJK 48,500 years before present. Its probable site of introduction is South Asia, since it is highly concentrated there.

H1a
With limited ancient DNA testing in South Asia, accordingly there is a limited amount of ancient samples for H1a, despite it being a populous and well distributed haplogroup today. The first set of ancient DNA from South Asia was published in March 2018. 65 samples were collected from the Swat Valley of northern Pakistan, 2 of which belonged to H1a.

H2
The earliest sample of H2 is found in the Pre-Pottery Neolithic B culture of the Levant 10,000 years ago. From ancient samples, it is clear that H2 also has a strong association with the spread of agriculture from Anatolia into Europe, and is commonly found with haplogroup G2a. H2 was found in Neolithic Anatolia, as well as in multiple later Neolithic cultures of Europe, such as the Vinča culture in Serbia, and the Megalith culture of Western Europe.

The 2021 study "Using Y-chromosome capture enrichment to resolve haplogroup H2 shows new evidence for a two-path Neolithic expansion to Western Europe" found that while H2 is less than 0.2% in modern-day western European populations it was more common during the Neolithic, between 1.5 and 9%. They identified two major clades H2m  and H2d. With respect to the current ISOGG nomenclature, H2m appears to be defined by a mix of H2, H2a, H2a1 and H2c1a SNPs while H2d appears to be defined by two H2b1 SNPs, and four additional SNPs which were previously undetected. They estimated TMRCA for H2d and H2m was  ~15.4 kya with H2m and H2d estimated TMRCAs of  ~11.8 and  ~11.9 kya respectively. H2 diversity probably existed in Near-Eastern hunter-gatherers and early farmers, and subsequently spread via the Neolithic expansion into Central and Western Europe. H2d was found along the inland/Danubian route into central Europe, but most H2m individuals are found along the Mediterranean route into Western Europe, the Iberian Peninsula and ultimately, Ireland.

There were also two occurrences of H2a found in the Neolithic Linkardstown burials in the southeast Ireland. More Neolithic H2 samples have been found in Germany and France.

Modern distribution

H1a

South Asia 
H-M69 is common among populations of Bangladesh, India, Sri Lanka, and Nepal, with lower frequency in Afghanistan and Pakistan. The highest frequency of Halpogroup H found in tribal groups such as 87% among Koraga, 70% among Koya and 62% among Gond. The high frequencies of H-M69 are in India, in both Dravidian and Indo Aryan castes (32.9%)., in Bangladesh (35.71%), and H-M52 among Kalash (20.5%) in Pakistan.

Haplogroup H is typically found among Indo-Aryan, Dravidian and Tribal (Indian as well as Pakistani Kalash) populations in the Indian subcontinent. In Europe it is mostly found among Romani, who belong predominantly (between 7% and 50%) to the H1a (M82) subclade.

Haplogroup H-M69 has been found in:
 Bangladesh - 35.71% (15/42).
South India – 27.2% (110/405) of a sample of unspecified ethnic composition. Halpogroup H found among Dravidian tribal groups in highest frequency. Koraga people carry 87% and Koya tribe have 70% halpogroup H. Gondi people carry around 62% of halpogroup H. Another study has found haplogroup H-M69 in 26.4% (192/728) of an ethnically diverse pool of samples from various regions of India.
Maharashtra - 33.3% of a sample of (68/204).
Gujarat - 20.69% (12/58)among Gujaratis in USA. 13.8% (4/29) among unspesified Gujaratis in India. 26% (13/50)among Dawoodi Bohra. 27.27 (6/22) among Bhils.
North India - According to a study(Trivedi2007) it is found 24.5% (44/180) in both Caste and tribal population of North India. Most frequently found : 20.7% (6/29) among Rajputs, 44.4% (8/18) among Chamar, 16.13% (5/31) among UP Brahmins, 10.53% (2/19) among Himachal Brahmin, 10.2% (5/49) in J&K Kashmiri Gujars, 9.8% (5/51) in J&K Kashmiri Pandits, 18.3% (9/49) among New Delhi Hindus, 14.81% (4/27) among Bihar Paswan.
 Sri Lanka – in 25.3% (23/91) of a sample of unspecified ethnic composition and in 10.3% (4/39) of a sample of Sinhalese.
 Nepal – one study has found Haplogroup H-M69 in approximately 12% of a sample of males from the general population of Kathmandu (including 4/77 H-M82, 4/77 H-M52(xM82), and 1/77 H-M69(xM52, APT)) and 6% of a sample of Newars (4/66 H-M82). In another study, Y-DNA that belongs to Haplogroup H-M69 has been found in 25.7% (5/37 = 13.5% H-M69 from a village in Morang District, 9/57 = 15.8% H-M69 from a village in Chitwan District, and 30/77 = 39.0% H-M69 from another village in Chitwan District) of Tharus in Nepal.
 Pakistan – in 4.1% Burusho, 20.5% Kalash, 4.2% Pashtun, and 6.3% in other Pakistanis. Another study has found haplogroup H-M69 in approximately 8% (3/38) of a sample of Burusho (also known as Hunza), including 5% (2/38) H-M82(xM36, M97, M39/M138) and 3% (1/38) H-M36. 
 Afghanistan – in 6.1% Pashtun, in 7.1% Tajik.

Roma people
Haplogroup H-M82 is a major lineage cluster in the Roma, especially Balkan Roma, among whom it accounts for approximately as high as 60% of males. A 2-bp deletion at M82 locus defining this haplogroup was also reported in one-third of males from traditional Roma populations living in Bulgaria, Spain, and Lithuania. High prevalence of Asian-specific Y chromosome haplogroup H-M82 supports their Indian origin and a hypothesis of a small number of founders diverging from a single ethnic group in India (Gresham et al. 2001).

Important studies show a limited introgression of the typical Roma Y-chromosome haplogroup H1 in several European groups, including approximately 0.61% in Gheg Albanians, 2.48% in Tosk Albanians and 0.9% in Serbians.

Europe, Caucasus, Central Asia & Middle East 
Haplogroup H1a is found at much lower levels outside of the Indian subcontinent and the Romani populations but is still present in other populations:

 Europe -  0.9% (1/113) H-M82 in a sample of Serbians,  2% (1/57) H-M82 in a sample of Macedonian Greeks, 1% (1/92 H-M82) to 2% (1/50 H-M69) of Ukrainians, H1a2a  in 1.3% (1/77) of a sample of Greeks.
 Caucasus-  2.6% (1/38) H-M82 in a sample of Balkarians, 
 Central Asia  - 12.5% (2/16) H-M52 in a sample of Tajiks from Dushanbe, 5.19% (7/135) H-M69 in a sample of Salar from Qinghai, 5.13% (2/39) H (including 1/39 H(xH1,H2) and 1/39 H1) in a sample of Uyghurs from Darya Boyi Village, Yutian (Keriya) County, Xinjiang, 4.65% (6/129) H-M69 in a sample of Mongols from Qinghai, 4.44% (2/45) H-M52 in a sample of Uzbeks from Samarkand, 3.56% (17/478) H-M69 and 0.84% (4/478) F-M89(xG-M201, H-M69, I-M258, J-M304, L-M20, N-M231, O-M175, P-M45, T-M272) in a sample of Uyghurs from the Hotan area, Xinjiang, 2.86% (2/70) H-M52 in a sample of Uzbeks from Xorazm, 2.44% (1/41) H-M52 in a sample of Uyghurs from Kazakhstan, 1.79% (1/56) H-M52 in a sample of Uzbeks from Bukhara, 1.71% (3/175) H-M69 in a sample of Hui from the Changji area, Xinjiang, 1.59% (1/63) H-M52 in a sample of Uzbeks from the Fergana Valley, 1.56% (1/64) H1 in a sample of Uyghurs from Qarchugha Village, Yuli (Lopnur) County, Xinjiang, 1.32% (1/76) H2 in a sample of Uyghurs from Horiqol Township, Awat County, Xinjiang, 0.99% (1/101) H-M69 in a sample of Kazakhs from the Hami area, Xinjiang.
 West Asia- 6% (1/17) H-M52 in a sample of Turks, 5% (1/20) H-M69 in a sample of Syrians, 4% (2/53) H-M52 in a sample of Iranians from Samarkand, 2.6% (3/117) H-M82 in a sample from southern Iran, 4.3% (7/164) of males from the United Arab Emirates, 2% of males from Oman, 1.9% (3/157) of males from Saudi Arabia, 1.4% (1/72 H-M82) of males from Qatar, and 0.6% (3/523) H-M370 in another sample of Turks.

East & South-East Asia
At the easternmost extent of its distribution, Haplogroup H-M69 has been found in Thais from Thailand (1/17 = 5.9% H-M69 Northern Thailand; 2/290 = 0.7% H-M52 Northern Thai; 2/75 = 2.7% H-M69(xM52) and 1/75 = 1.3% H-M52(xM82) general population of Thailand), Balinese (19/551 = 3.45% H-M69), Tibetans (3/156 = 1.9% H-M69(xM52, APT)), Filipinos from southern Luzon (1/55 = 1.8% H-M69(xM52)), Bamars from Myanmar (1/59 = 1.7% H-M82, with the relevant individual having been sampled in Bago Region), Chams from Binh Thuan, Vietnam (1/59 = 1.7% H-M69), and Mongolians (1/149 = 0.7% H-M69). The subclade H-M39/M138 has been observed in the vicinity of Cambodia, including one instance in a sample of six Cambodians and one instance in a sample of 18 individuals from Cambodia and Laos. A genome study about Khmer people resulted in an average amount of 16,5% of Khmer belonging to y-DNA H.

H1b 
H1b is defined by the SNPs - B108, Z34961, Z34962, Z34963, and Z34964. Only discovered in 2015, H1b was detected in a single sample from an individual in Myanmar. Due to only being classified recently, there are currently no studies recording H1b in modern populations.

H2 
H2 (H-P96), which is defined by seven SNPs – P96, M282, L279, L281, L284, L285, and L286 – is the only primary branch found mainly outside South Asia. Formerly named F3, H2 was reclassified as belonging to haplogroup H due to sharing the marker M3035 with H1. While being found in numerous ancient samples, H2 has only been found scarcely in modern populations across West Eurasia.

H3 
H3 (Z5857) like H1, is also mostly centered in South Asia. albeit at much lower frequencies.

Like other branches of H, due to it being newly classified it is not explicitly found in modern population studies. Samples belonging to H3 were likely labeled under F*. In consumer testing, it has been found principally among South Indians and Sri Lankans, and other areas of Asia such as Arabia as well.
The following gives a summary of most of the studies which specifically tested for the subclades H1a1a (H-M82) and H2 (H-P96), formerly F3, showing its distribution in different part of the world.

See also

References

External links 

 The India Genealogical Project

H-M69